Viscount Lyons, of Christchurch in the County of Southampton, was a title in Peerage of the United Kingdom. It was created on 24 November 1881 for the diplomat Richard Lyons, 2nd Baron Lyons. In 1887 it was announced that he was to be created an Earl but he died before the patent was sealed. On his death all his titles became extinct. The title of Baron Lyons, of Christchurch in the County of Southampton, had been created in the Peerage of the United Kingdom on 25 June 1856 for his father, the naval commander and fellow diplomat Admiral Sir Edmund Lyons, 1st Baronet. He had already been created a baronet, of Christchurch in the County of Southampton, in the Baronetage of the United Kingdom on 29 July 1840.

The first Baron was the son of John Lyons, the brother of Humphrey Lyons and the uncle of Sir Algernon Lyons.

Barons Lyons (1856)
Edmund Lyons, 1st Baron Lyons (1790–1858)
Richard Bickerton Pemell Lyons, 2nd Baron Lyons (1817–1887) (created Viscount Lyons in 1881)

Viscounts Lyons (1881)
Richard Bickerton Pemell Lyons, 1st Viscount Lyons (1817–1887)

References

Extinct viscountcies in the Peerage of the United Kingdom
Noble titles created in 1881